Ivana Jorović was the defending champion, but chose not to participate.

Zhu Lin won the title after Peng Shuai retired at 6–3, 1–3 in the final.

Seeds

Draw

Finals

Top half

Bottom half

References

External Links
Main Draw

Shenzhen Longhua Open - Singles
Shenzhen Longhua Open
2019 in Chinese tennis